The diocese of Rufiniana (Latin: Dioecesis Rufinianensis) is a suppressed and titular bishopric of the Roman Catholic Church.
The exact location of the diocese, now lost to history but it was in northern Tunisia.

History 
There are two documented bishops of this diocese:
the Catholic Mariano, who spoke at the Carthage conference of 411, which saw the Catholic and Donatist bishops of Roman Africa gathered together; on that occasion the bishopric did not have Donatist bishops; 
the bishop Donatus, who took part in the synod gathered in Carthage by the Vandal king of Hungary in 484, after which he was exiled.

Today Rufiniana survives as a titular bishop's seat; the current titular bishop is Anton Leichtfried, auxiliary bishop of Sankt Pölten.

Known Bishops
 Mariano (fl 411)
 Donato (fl 484)
 Nikë Prela  (1969 - 1996)
 Luiz Vicente Bernetti, (1996 - 2005)
 Anton Leichtfried, (2006 - current)

References

Archaeological sites in Tunisia
Roman towns and cities in Africa (Roman province)
Catholic titular sees in Africa